Massagris mirifica is a jumping spider species in the genus Massagris that lives in South Africa. The male was first identified by George and Elizabeth Peckham in 1903.

References

Endemic fauna of South Africa
Spiders described in 1903
Salticidae
Spiders of South Africa